Coláiste Lurgan is an independent summer school that runs three-week Irish-language immersion courses in the Connemara Gaeltacht village of Inverin in County Galway.

As part of their student-directed focus in language teaching, the school runs TG Lurgan, an initiative for helping students to acquire vocabulary by producing covers of popular music. The pop group, Seo Linn, was formed following the success of some of these covers.

References 

Summer schools